Venilale, officially Venilale Administrative Post, is an administrative post (and was formerly a subdistrict) in Baucau municipality, East Timor.

The administrative post has a population of 17,495 people in 2015 and has an area of 155.70 km. It comprises 8 sucos (villages): Bado-Ho'o, Baha Mori, Fatulia, Uailaha, Uai Oli, Uatu Haco, Uma Ana Ico, Uma Ana Ulo. Local Languages spoken include Midiki, Makasae and Tetum. Portuguese, English and Bahasa Indonesia are spoken by some people in the area.

References

External links 

  – information page on Ministry of State Administration site 

Administrative posts of East Timor
Baucau Municipality